Tang Kolureh (also Romanized as Tang Kolūreh) is a village in Armand Rural District, in the Central District of Lordegan County, Chaharmahal and Bakhtiari Province, Iran. At the 2006 census, its population was 834, in 180 families.

References 

Populated places in Lordegan County